The 2012–13 season was the 116th season of competitive football by Heart of Midlothian, and their 30th consecutive season in the top level of Scottish football, competing in the Scottish Premier League. Hearts also competed in the Europa League, League Cup and the Scottish Cup.

Summary

Season
Hearts finished tenth in the Scottish Premier League. They reached the Play-off Round of the Europa League, the Fourth round of the Scottish Cup and reached the Final of the League Cup losing 3–2 to St Mirren at Hampden.

Financial problems
The club continued to experience financial problems with some of the senior team not getting paid on time in September. Some players and the management team did not receive there wages in October on time either, which led to the Scottish Premier League (SPL) hitting the club with a transfer embargo. The embargo meant Hearts were unable to sign any players until at least 23 December 2012. In December, the embargo was extended indefinitely as Hearts were deemed to have broken SPL rules by failing to pay a number of bonuses and appearance payments in a timely manner. On 17 January 2013, the embargo was lifted and replaced with signing restrictions until the end of the season, meaning Hearts could only sign players under the age of 21, on less wages and on a one in one out basis.

In early November, the club were subject to a tax tribunal against HMRC over a £1.75m bill. The case centred around the transfer of players on loan from FBK Kaunas and whether tax on the players full earnings should have been paid in the UK rather than in Lithuania where there is a lower rate of taxation. Kaunas paid the large part of the players wages and in doing so paid tax in Lithuania. Shortly after the club was issued with a winding up order over a £449,692.04 unpaid tax bill forcing the club to issue a plea for emergency backing from its fans amid fears Hearts did not have enough funds to continue past their scheduled game against St Mirren on 17 November. Fans were urged to buy match tickets to sell out games and take part in the club's share issue.

n order to fill the shortfall in funds at the club

On 4 May, Hearts released their financial figures for year ending June 2012. Showing that they had made a loss of £1.65 million and debt had been increased slightly to £24.7m. Hearts said that this was due to the HMRC tax liability being reported during this period. They also further reduced operating costs and employment costs. Turnover at the club increased by £1.76m to £8.68m, this was mainly due to player sales and competing in European competition.

Pre-season

Fixtures

Scottish Premier League 

The fixture list for the first 33 Scottish Premier League matches in the 2012–13 season was announced on 18 June. Hearts were given a home game to start the season against St Johnstone.

Europa League 

Hearts entered the Europa League during the Play-off round having won the 2011–12 Scottish Cup. The draw took place on 10 August 2012, Hearts were unseeded and were drawn against English Premier League side Liverpool. The tie is the club's second all British affair in two seasons having been drawn against Tottenham Hotspur in the same round the previous season.

Fixtures

League Cup

Having qualified for the 2012–13 UEFA Europa League, Hearts entered the League Cup at the third round stage. The draw was held on 3 September and the club were drawn against First Division side Livingston, Hearts won the tie 3–1 and progressed to the quarter-final. Hearts went ahead through a deflected goal from Danny Grainger, before Marc McNulty equalised following a defensive mistake. Marius Žaliūkas then scored twice in quick succession to cancel out his earlier error.

Hearts were drawn away to Dundee United for the quarter-final. Callum Paterson opened the scoring before Johnny Russell equalised for the home side, before Hearts had Darren Barr sent off but managed to force the match to extra time. Hearts went on to win the match 5–4 on penalties in a dramatic shoot out, with 14 penalties being taken in total.

The draw for the semi-final took place on 8 November, and Hearts were drawn against fellow Scottish Premier League side Inverness Caledonian Thistle. Andrew Shinnie put the Highlanders ahead shortly after half time, but debutant Michael Ngoo struck the equaliser before Scott Robinson was sent off for a two footed tackle on Inverness player Owain Tudor Jones. The teams could not be separated and the match went to penalties with Hearts going through for the second round in a row, with Philip Roberts missing the last penalty. The result meant Hearts would return to Hampden nine months after lifting the Scottish Cup, and would face either St Mirren or Celtic in the final. The following day St Mirren beat Celtic 3–2 setting up a non Old Firm final. Following completion of the round Inverness asked the Scottish Football Association (SFA) for clarity over whether Hearts player Danny Wilson should have been suspended for the tie, due to speculation over whether he had served a ban from his time at Rangers. The SFA later confirmed that he was eligible and had served the ban when he joined Liverpool in 2010.

Hearts were led into the final by Gary Locke in his first game as the club's official manager, with Andy Webster captaining the side. Hearts went ahead early on through Ryan Stevenson, although their early dominance faltered with Esmaël Gonçalves equalising just before half time. Hearts were struck hard in the second half with Steven Thompson and Conor Newton scoring consecutively to make it 3–1, before Stevenson struck again to make it 3–2. The result meant the cup returned to Paisley for the first time.

Fixtures

Scottish Cup

Hearts entered the Scottish Cup at the fourth round stage. The draw was conducted on 5 November and drew the cup holders against Edinburgh Derby rival Hibernian, a repeat of the 2012 Scottish Cup Final. The team crashed out the cup, courtesy of an 84th-minute goal from David Wotherspoon. The shot was heavily deflected off Hearts captain Marius Žaliūkas into the net.

Fixtures

Player statistics

Captains

Squad information
This section includes all players who have been part of the first team during the season. They may not have made an appearance.
Last updated 18 May 2013

                                

Appearances (starts and substitute appearances) and goals include those in the Scottish Premier League, Scottish Cup, League Cup and the UEFA Europa League.
1Player first came to the club on loan and was transferred the following year.
Squad only includes players currently registered with the club and those with professional contracts only.

Disciplinary record
Includes all competitive matches. 
Last updated 18 May 2013

Top scorers  
Last updated on 18 May 2013

Clean sheets
{| class="wikitable" style="font-size: 95%; text-align: center;"
|-
!width=15|  
!width=15|
!width=15|
!width=150|Name
!width=80|Premier League
!width=80|Europa League
!width=80|League Cup
!width=80|Scottish Cup
!width=80|Total
|-
|1
|GK
|
|Jamie MacDonald
|13
|0
|0
|0
|13
|-
|
|
|
! Totals !! 13 !! 0 !! 0 !! 0 !! 13
|-

Team statistics

League table

Division summary

Management statistics
Last updated on 18 May 2013

Club

Club staff

Management
At the end of the previous season manager Paulo Sérgio's contract expired and he returned to Portugal awaiting an offer from the club. The club offered him reduced terms and with concerns offer the size of his player's budget for the new season, on 7 June 2012, Hearts announced he had rejected the clubs offer and would not return to the club.

On 26 June 2012, John McGlynn was appointed as manager on a one-year contract. McGlynn had previously been caretaker manager on two occasions in 2005. Former Hearts player Edgaras Jankauskas was appointed as Assistant Manager with Gary Locke remaining as first-team coach.

On 28 February 2013, with the club sitting second bottom of the league McGlynn left the club by mutual consent. Coach Gary Locke and player development manager Darren Murray took over as the club's interim management team. On 16 March, Locke was appointed as manager until the end of the 2013–14 season.

Playing kit
Hearts signed a long-term deal with Adidas as their kit manufacture for the 2012–13 season, replacing Umbro. Wonga.com remained as the shirts sponsor for the second consecutive season.

Club and player awards
The Heart of Midlothian young player of the year awards took place on 6 April 2013, with Angus Beith, Callum Tapping and Jamie Walker the recipients of the nights awards. The Heart of Midlothian player of the year awards took place on 19 May, with Jason Holt winning goal of the year, Jamie MacDonald save of the year, Marius Žaliūkas fans player of the year and Jamie MacDonald also taking player's player of the year. A special award the Doc Melvin Memorial Award was also given to ex Hearts physiotherapist Alan Rae, and the favourite moment of the year was declared as taking the lead at Anfield against Liverpool in the Europa League. Other awards over the course of the season included Jamie Walker winning the Weatherseal's Window of Opportunity Award, given to a player who has made the most of their first team opportunities and the club's match day programme winning best in the SPL and best in Scotland.

Transfers

Hearts first activity for the new season came with the announcement on 27 April 2012, that David Obua, Aaron Murdoch, Chris Tobin, Ryan Stewart, Colin Hamilton and Matthew Park had not been offered new contracts for the new season. Further announcements followed with the news that Ian Black, Adrian Mrowiec, Stephen Elliott, Gary Glen and Jordan Morton had also not been offered new contracts. On 6 July 2012, it was announced that both Suso Santana and Craig Beattie had turned down new contract offers and would also leave the club. Further departures included Jason Thomson, Chris Kane, Jonny Stewart, Gary Graham and the previous season's top scorer Rudi Skacel.

During pre-season the club brought in Rory Boulding and Anton Peterlin on trial. Neither signed for the club.

John McGlynn's first signing as manager was Finnish international Peter Enckelman, who was brought in as cover following an injury to Mark Ridgers. On transfer deadline day, Ryan Stevenson returned to the club signing a three-year contract, Liam Gordon signed from Raith Rovers and David Smith went the other way on loan. Hearts also accepted an undisclosed bid from Rangers for David Templeton and Ryan McGowan, with the latter opting to stay at Hearts after contract talks with Rangers.

On 3 September, the club signed Alan Combe as a coach but was also registered as a player. He was able to sign out with the transfer window as had been released from his contract with Greenock Morton on the last day of the transfer window. In October free agent Rudi Skacel returned to the club to train, however a deal to re-sign him was stopped by Hearts transfer ban. The club sent three more under-20 players out on loan during the first half of the season, Brad McKay, Callum Tapping and Jack Hamilton.

In December Arturas Rimkevicius was brought in on trial, with a view to signing in January. The deal fell through due to the club's enforced restriction on signing over 21's. On 4 January 2013, with his short-term contract expired Peter Enckelman was released by the club. A Further departure was confirmed on 7 January, with Ryan McGowan completing his move to Chinese club Shandong Luneng Taishan. The club had accepted a £400.000 bid the previous week. On 18 January, Danny Wilson signed on loan until the end of the season, from English Premier League side Liverpool, this was closely followed by his Liverpool teammate Michael Ngoo who also arrived on loan. Further departures included non-first team players Callum Wyllie, Michael Thomson, Danny Thomson and Ewan Saunderson, meaning six players departed during the January transfer window. In February, Andrew Driver was allowed to leave the club to join Houston Dynamo on loan until his contract expired in the summer.

Players in

Players out

Loans in

Loans out

Contract extensions
The following players extended their contracts with the club over the course of the season.

See also
List of Heart of Midlothian F.C. seasons

Notes

External links
 	BBC Sport Hearts
	Edinburgh Evening News – Heart of Midlothian FC

References 

Heart of Midlothian F.C. seasons
Heart of Midlothian
Heart of Midlothian